David Hoey is an American window dresser and the senior director for visual presentation at Bergdorf Goodman famed for his work for the aforementioned high end New York City specialty store.  in 2010 his work along with that of his predecessor and current store vice-president Linda Fargo entitled "Windows at Bergdorf Goodman" became the subject of a book published by Assouline, which retailed for $550.

For the holiday windows  production at Bergdorfs' he oversees a staff of over one hundred to design the entire spectacular.  Hoey appears in the 2013 biopic about the store Scatter My Ashes at Bergdorf's.

References

Living people
Year of birth missing (living people)
Window dressers
American fashion businesspeople